The 1984–85 season was the 88th season of competitive football in Scotland. As of 2022, this is the last time a non-Old Firm club won the Scottish Premier title.

Scottish Premier Division

Champions: Aberdeen
Relegated: Dumbarton, Morton.

Scottish League Division One

Promoted: Motherwell, Clydebank 
Relegated: Meadowbank Thistle, St Johnstone (The first team to be relegated in successive seasons)

Scottish League Division Two

Promoted: Montrose, Alloa Athletic

Other honours

Cup honours

Individual honours

Scotland national team

Key:
(H) = Home match
(A) = Away match
WCQG7 = World Cup qualifying - Group 7

See also
 1984–85 Aberdeen F.C. season

Notes and references

 
Seasons in Scottish football